1,4-Dichlorobenzene (1,4-DCB, p-DCB, or para-dichlorobenzene, sometimes abbreviated as PDCB or para) is an organic compound with the formula C6H4Cl2. This colorless solid has a strong odor. The molecule consists of a benzene ring with two chlorine atoms (replacing hydrogen atoms) on opposing sites of the ring.

It is used as a disinfectant, pesticide, and deodorant, most familiarly in mothballs in which it is a replacement for the more traditional naphthalene because of naphthalene's greater flammability (though both chemicals have the same NFPA 704 rating).  It is also used as a precursor in the production of the chemically and thermally resistant polymer poly(p-phenylene sulfide).

Production 
p-DCB is produced by chlorination of benzene using ferric chloride as a catalyst:
C6H6  +  2 Cl2  →  C6H4Cl2  +  2 HCl
The chief impurity is the 1,2 isomer. The compound can be purified by fractional crystallization, taking advantage of its relatively high melting point of 53.5 °C; the isomeric dichlorobenzenes and chlorobenzene melt well below room temperature.

Uses

Disinfectant, deodorant, and pesticide
p-DCB is used to control moths, molds, and mildew. It also finds use as a disinfectant in waste containers and restrooms and is the characteristic smell associated with urinal cakes. Its usefulness for these applications arises from p-DCB's low solubility in water and its relatively high volatility: it sublimes readily near room temperature.

Precursor to other chemicals 
Nitration gives 1,4-dichloronitrobenzene, a precursor to commercial dyes and pigments. The chloride sites on p-DCB can be substituted with hydroxylamine and sulfide groups. In a growing application, p-DCB is the precursor to the high performance polymer poly(p-phenylene sulfide):

Environmental and health effects 
p-DCB is poorly soluble in water and is not easily broken down by soil organisms. Like many hydrocarbons, p-DCB is lipophilic and will accumulate in fatty tissues if consumed by a person or animal.

The United States Department of Health and Human Services (DHHS) and the International Agency for Research on Cancer (IARC) have determined that p-DCB may reasonably be anticipated to be a carcinogen. This has been indicated by animal studies, although a full-scale human study has not been done.

The United States Environmental Protection Agency (EPA) has set a target maximum contaminant level of 75 micrograms of p-DCB per liter of drinking water (75 μg/L), but publishes no information on the cancer risk.  p-DCB is also an EPA-registered pesticide. The United States Occupational Safety and Health Administration (OSHA) has set a maximum level of 75 parts of p-DCB per million parts air in the workplace (75 ppm) for an 8-hour day, 40-hour workweek.

A mechanism for the carcinogenic effects of mothballs and some types of air fresheners containing p-DCB has been identified in roundworms.

Due to its carcinogenic nature, use of paradichlorobenzene in the European Union is forbidden as an air freshener (since 2005) and in mothballs (since 2008).

See also 
 Air freshener
 Camphor
 Dichlorobenzene
 Mothball

References

External links 
 
 Mothball sniffing warning issued, BBC News, 27 July 2006
 NIOSH Pocket Guide to Chemical Hazards, Centers for Disease Control and Prevention

Organochloride insecticides
IARC Group 2B carcinogens
Chlorobenzenes